"Kentucky Rye" is the third and final segment of the third episode of the first season (1985–1986) of the television series The Twilight Zone. In this segment, a drunk driver emerges from a crash to enter the bar of his dreams.

Synopsis
Bob Spindler is celebrating the closing of a big deal with co-workers in a bar and consumes an excessive amount of alcohol. The reactions of Spindler's wife (on the phone) and his co-workers indicate that this is not a one-off occurrence. Spindler tells his boss he will get a cab but then drives himself while inebriated. While he is adjusting the radio and driving in the wrong lane, a car approaches from the other direction and they both veer off the road. Spindler hits some trees. He gets out and, despite having a head wound, enters a nearby old bar called Kentucky Rye.

The Kentucky Rye is alight with laughter, camaraderie, and alcoholic drinks. Spindler finds his head wound is gone and he fits into the bar's intoxicating atmosphere. Spindler notices a somber-faced man and a gloomy-faced woman in the bar, but doesn't worry about it as he consumes beer after beer.

The bartender offers to sell Spindler Kentucky Rye for $1,600 but only if he does so that night. Spindler only has $1,500 but after the somber-faced man loans him $100, he makes the purchase. As soon as he does, the whole tavern goes quiet and sombre. Spindler has another drink and passes out on the pool table.

When Spindler awakens, the bar is cobwebbed and abandoned. The somber-faced man claims Spindler ran him off the road, causing his death, and that the gloomy woman is his widow, who is being interviewed by police. Spindler is confused, since in his drunken state he perceived the other driver as the one in the wrong lane. He then sees the somber-faced man's body being loaded into an ambulance and that his ghost is gone. When Spindler tries to get out he finds the doors locked and through a window he sees himself being loaded into an ambulance in order to treat his head wound. Screaming to be let out, Spindler sees the image of the bartender in the mirror, but when he turns to where the image would be reflected from, there is no one there. The bartender's image laughs and cries out: "It's yours. It's all yours!" Spindler is left alone with nothing but empty bottles.

External links

1985 American television episodes
The Twilight Zone (1985 TV series season 1) episodes
Television episodes about alcohol abuse

fr:Kentucky Rye